Homeobox protein engrailed-1 is a protein that in humans is encoded by the EN1 gene.

Function 

Homeobox-containing genes are thought to have a role in controlling development. In Drosophila, the engrailed (en) gene plays an important role during development in segmentation, where it is required for the formation of posterior compartments. Different mutations in the mouse homologs, En1 and En2, produced different developmental defects that frequently are lethal. The human engrailed homologs 1 and 2 encode homeodomain-containing proteins and have been implicated in the control of pattern formation during development of the central nervous system and the limbs.

Engrailed (En) 1 is a homeobox gene that helps regulate development in the dorsal midbrain and anterior hindbrain (cerebellum and colliculi) of humans.  It is also essential in regulating the establishment of a dorso-ventral pattern in developing limbs. The expression of En1 is regulated until 13 days after fertilization by Fgf8, which controls the development of the forebrain and hindbrain.  En1 is first expressed in this region on day 9.5 after fertilization for about 12 hours until En2 is expressed. After En2 expression, En1 is expressed again in other tissues such as somites and limb ectoderm throughout development. A knockout mouse model with the En1 homeobox deleted was developed; mice died less than 24 hours after birth because appeared to be unable to feed.  The brains of the mice were studied and most of the cerebellum, colliculi, and cranial nerves 3 and 4 were missing. There was clear deletion in the mid-hindbrain, isthmus, junction region that began at day 9.5 after fertilization. All of the mice demonstrated marked forepaw deformities including fusion of digits and abnormal dorso-ventral patterning. The 13th ribs and sternums displayed delayed and abnormal ossification. The mouse model demonstrated that the expression of En1 is critical in the correct development of the brain, limbs, and sternum. 

In 2021, a group of scientists and physicians around Andrea Superti-Furga in Lausanne and Stefan Mundlos in Berlin showed that biallelic loss-of-function variants at the EN1 locus result in a human phenotype that includes a severe impairment of limb development as well as cerebellar aplasia, reproducing the phenotype first observed in the gene knock-out mice described above. They also found that there is a long non-coding RNA (lncRNA) element at approx. 300 kb distance from EN1, that they called MAENLI (for Master on Engrailed-1 in the Limbs), that is responsible for activation of EN1 gene expression in the developing limbs. The biallelic loss of the MAENLI lncRNA element results in impairment of limb development in humans as seen in the EN1-associated condition, while cerebellar development is not affected.

References

Further reading

External links 
 

Transcription factors